Tomorrow and Tomorrow may refer to:

 Tomorrow and Tomorrow (film), 1932 film based on a Broadway play
 Tomorrow and Tomorrow (novel), 1997 science fiction novel by Charles Sheffield
 "Tomorrow and Tomorrow", the second subtitled section of "Epitaph" (song), a 1969 song by King Crimson

See also
 "Tomorrow Tomorrow" (Bee Gees song)
 Tomorrow and Tomorrow & The Fairy Chessmen, 1951 collection of two science fiction novels by Lewis Padgett
 Tomorrow and tomorrow and tomorrow (disambiguation)
 Tomorrow (disambiguation)